Losaria coon, the common clubtail, is a butterfly belonging to the swallowtail family, Papilionidae. The butterfly belongs to the clubtails, genus Losaria. It includes several subspecies and is found from the Nicobar Islands and Assam in India, east to Hainan in China, and south through Indochina, to Java and other islands of Indonesia and Bangladesh.

Description
Both sexes are generally alike, however the females have broader wings and shorter hindwing tails. The butterfly has long and narrow wings and a characteristic spatulate tail, which gives it its name. The forewing is black with pale markings between the veins. Two-thirds of the cell of the hindwing is white with a row of white spots around it. It has crimson or dusky white lunules along the margin and disc.

Detailed description as given in Bingham (1907) is as follows:

Bingham describes race cacharensis, Butler, the subspecies found in Cachar (Assam) as follows:

Distribution
The common clubtail is a woodland species which may be found both in the plains and the hills. This butterfly is found in Assam, Manipur and the Nicobar Islands (India), through mainland Southeast Asia, east to Hainan (China), and south to the Indonesian islands of Sumatra, Java and Bawean. It is absent from Borneo.

Subspecies
Losaria coon has eight subspecies, excluding the former L. palu, now regarded as the separate species Losaria palu (Palu swallowtail).

There are eight subspecies reported for this species:
 the nominate subspecies coon 
 doubledayi (Wallace, 1865) 
 cacharensis (Butler, 1885) 
 sambilanga (Doherty, 1886) 
 delianus (Fruhstorfer, 1895) 
 palembanganus (Rothschild, 1896) 
 patianus (Fruhstorfer, 1898) 
 insperatus (Joicey & Talbot, 1921)

Subspecies of the common clubtail found in India are:
 Losaria coon cacharensis (Butler, 1885) Assam (where rare), Meghalaya east and south as far as Peninsular Malaysia
 Losaria coon sambilanga (Doherty, 1886) Nicobar Islands of India (very rare) and when found in the Nicobar Islands it is protected under Indian law.

Habits
It has been recorded in Manipur during February and April and from July to October. The distinctive black and yellow/orange/red (depending on subspecies) markings and slow flight indicate that it is a protected butterfly being inedible due to sequestration of certain chemicals from the plants that the caterpillar feeds on.

Food plant
 Apama tomentosa

Life cycle
The caterpillar is variable in colour and ranges from reddish grey to black and has many black spots and stripes.

See also
List of butterflies of South Asia
List of butterflies of India (Papilionidae)

Cited references

Additional references
 Carter, David. (1992, 2000) Dorling Kindersley Handbook of Butterflies and Moths. London. 
 
 
 Rahman, M.S., Haidar, I.K.A., Neogi, A.K., Hasan, M.A.U., Rahman, M.M. and Imam, S.M.S 2016. First record of six species and subspecies of butterflies (Insecta: Lepidoptera) in Bangladesh. Journal of Insect Biodiversity and Systematics, 2 (3): 373–380.

External links

coon
Butterflies of Asia
Butterflies of Singapore
Insects of China
Fauna of the Andaman and Nicobar Islands
Butterflies of Java
Butterflies of Indochina
Butterflies described in 1793